Heriberto Olvera Hernández (born 13 May 1990) is a Mexican professional footballer who is a free agent.

References

External links
 

Living people
1990 births
Association football defenders
C.F. Pachuca players
Tampico Madero F.C. footballers
Murciélagos FC footballers
Mineros de Zacatecas players
Lobos BUAP footballers
Atlas F.C. footballers
Liga MX players
Ascenso MX players
Liga Premier de México players
Tercera División de México players
Footballers from Hidalgo (state)
Sportspeople from Pachuca
Mexican footballers